Taaza Khabar is an Indian fantasy comedy thriller miniseries written by Abbas Dalal and Hussain Dalal; directed by Himank Gaur. It stars Bhuvan Bam, Shriya Pilgaonkar, J. D. Chakravarthy, Deven Bhojani, Prathamesh Parab, Nitya Mathur, and Shilpa Shukla. 

The web series is OTT debut of Youtuber Bhuvan Bam.

Premise 
Taaza Khabar is the story of Vasant "Vasya" Gawade, a sanitation worker who comes across a magical boon that can predict future and creates curls in his life and everyone around him.

Cast 
 Bhuvan Bam as Vasant "Vasya" Gawade
 Shriya Pilgaonkar as Madhubala "Madhu"
 J. D. Chakravarthy as Shetty Anna
 Deven Bhojani as Mehboob
 Prathmesh Parab as Raja Chaturvedi aka Peter
 Nitya Mathur as Shazia
 Shilpa Shukla as Aapa
 Mithilesh Chaturvedi as Billmoriya
 Mahesh Manjrekar as Kismat Bhai
 Atisha Naik as Vasant's Mother
 Vijay Nikam as Vasant's Father
 Vipul Deshpande

Episodes

Season 1 (2023)

Reception 
Taaza Khabar season 1 released on 6 January 2023 on Disney+Hotstar. Archika Khurana of The Times of India rate 3 out of 5 stars and wrote "‘Taaza Khabar’ is an interesting watch for the way it narrates the everyday life of a simpleton with big dreams. It also reflects how people’s attitudes and behaviours shift when money is involved." Reviewing for NDTV, Saibal Chatterjee rated the web series 2/5 stars and wrote "Expect no magic in Taaza Khabar." Sukanya Verma for Rediff.com wrote "Half a dozen episodes play out like an offhanded discussion between writers planning incidents and consequences but nothing is fleshed out." Nandini Ramnath of Scroll.in wrote "Hell-bent on giving Vasant his comeuppance, the show’s makers miss some of the more unexpected turns that the story could have taken." Subham Kulkarni for Koimoi wrote "For a long format show that has all the time in building a slow burning tale of a man rising from rags to riches, the team takes a feature film approach where every five minutes Vasant climbs peak after with no time for the viewer to digest his success so one can root for it." Pratikshya Mishra of The Quint wrote "As the poster suggests, Taaza Khabar is the Bhuvan Bam show – the secondary characters, though better written than I expected – still remain only secondary in the plot." Zinia Bandyopadhyay of India Today rated 2.5/5 stars and wrote "It is the screenplay that you might have a complaint about, as it seems not-so-genuine. What was very important for the series to achieve was empathy for its lead character, as well as the friends he has." Manik Sharma of Firstpost wrote "There isn’t a lack of commitment here, for Bam does go all-out to fit into a role that belies his larger-than-life personality as an internet icon. Turns out, acting is not an equal sport and it demands, and exposes in equal measure. Bam isn’t exactly disappointing here, but never effective either." Sanjana Deshpande for The Free Press Journal wrote "'Taaza Khabar' is crafted out of Bollywood's favourite trope, and starts on a promising note only leaving viewers high and dry. The end does not make viewers any wiser." Devasheesh Pandey of India TV rated 2.5/5 stars and wrote "The cinematography and music help a lot in making the world of Taaza Khabar seem palpable. The dialogue play is convincing but nothing extraordinary." Kartik Bhardwaj of The New Indian Express wrote "Taaza Khabar does show promise at the start. It doesn’t play up Bam’s YouTube image, but rather than portraying him as an actor, it gets entangled in projecting him as the ‘hero’."

References

External link
 

Hindi-language Disney+ Hotstar original programming
2023 Indian television series debuts
Indian comedy television series
Hindi-language television shows
2023 web series debuts
Indian web series